Exetastes is a genus of parasitoid wasps belonging to the family Ichneumonidae.

The genus was first described by Johann Ludwig Christian Gravenhorst in 1829.

The genus has cosmopolitan distribution.

Species:
 Exetastes adpressorius
 Exetastes albiger 
 Exetastes albimarginalis 
 Exetastes atrator  
 Exetastes bimaculatus 
 Exetastes compressus 
 Exetastes crousae 
 Exetastes fornicator 
 Exetastes fukuchiyamanus 
 Exetastes ichneumoniformis 
 Exetastes ishikawensis

References

Ichneumonidae
Ichneumonidae genera